Timiskaming (former official designation Timiskaming 19) is a First Nations reserve in the Abitibi-Témiscamingue region of Quebec, Canada, just north of the head of Lake Timiskaming. It belongs to the Timiskaming First Nation, an Algonquin band. It is geographically within the Témiscamingue Regional County Municipality but administratively not part of it.

History
But piece-by-piece, the reserve was reduced in size when the Indians ceded lots back to the government in 1897, 1898, every year from 1905 to 1917, 1939, 1953, and 1955. But many of these surrenders are now being disputed.

On October 23, 1999, the Quebec government officially recognized a name change from Timiscaming to Timiskaming. On July 30, 2002, the Department of Indian Affairs recognized that the reserve's name was changed to Timiskaming.

Demographics

Population
As of May 2022, the registered population of the Timiskaming First Nation is 2,519 members, of whom 648 live on the Timiskaming reserve and 1,871 live off reserve.

Language
Mother tongue:
 English as first language: 87.5%
 French as first language: 8.7%
 English and French as first language: 1.9%
 Other as first language: 1.9%

Economy
The reserve's economy is tied to the adjacent town of Notre-Dame-du-Nord and mostly based on logging, farming, construction, and tourism. There are about 15 enterprises on the reserve. The Timiskaming First Nation administration employs about 70 persons.

Education
There is only one school on the reserve: Kiwetin School, providing pre-Kindergarten to grade 8. It had an enrolment of 65 students in 2008-2009.

References

Algonquin
Communities in Abitibi-Témiscamingue
Indian reserves in Quebec